In research communities (for example, earth sciences, astronomy, business, and government), subsetting is the process of retrieving just the parts (a subset) of large files which are of interest for a specific purpose. This occurs usually in a client—server setting, where the extraction of the parts of interest occurs on the server before the data is sent to the client over a network. The main purpose of subsetting is to save bandwidth on the network and storage space on the client computer.

Subsetting may be favorable for the following reasons:
 restrict or divide the time range
 select cross sections of data
 select particular kinds of time series
 exclude particular observations

Subsetting within programs 
You can subset within statistical software programs to help speed up the process of subsetting if needed. There are many different types of subsetting that can provide challenges with using software programs though. 

Some types of subsetting are: 
 Atomic Vectors
 Lists
 Matrices and Arrays
 Data Frames
 S3 Objects
 S4 Objects

For example, in the software program R as, there are different types of code to help with each type of subsetting.

References

Information retrieval techniques